Not Me (He... Is Not Me) is a Thai action television drama series, starring Jumpol Adulkittiporn (Off) and Atthaphan Phunsawat (Gun). The plot revolves around White disguising himself as his twin Black in order to discover who betrayed him, and who attacked him and put him in a coma.

Directed by Anucha Boonyawatana (Nuchie) and produced by the Thai production company GMMTV, this series is one of sixteen television series of the corporation for 2021 during their "GMMTV 2021: The New Decade Begins" event on 3 December 2020. It will air every Sunday at 20:30 (8:30 pm) on GMM25 (replacing the Sunday rerun of Our Skyy) and the streaming platform AIS PLAY simultaneously. The official trailer was released on 29 November 2021, along with its official casts and characters.

It was featured on Teen Vogue's best BL dramas of 2022 list.

Synopsis 
Identical twins Black (Gun) and White (also Gun) share an emotional bond that is so strong that they feel each other’s pain. To lessen their bond, their parents divide them from each other in their early teenage years. After graduating from university abroad, White returns to Bangkok to follow in his father’s footsteps by preparing to become a diplomat. However, shortly after his arrival in Thailand, the bond to his twin makes itself known once more as White suffers excruciating pain when Black gets beaten into a coma. In order to find out who hurt his brother, White takes on his identity and infiltrates Black’s gang made up of political activists - a group of university students turned vigilantes, who put their life on the line for a fairer Thai society.

Increasingly, White finds himself questioning his own complicity in the conservative and unjust dynamics surrounding him. Along the way, his teammate, and Black’s rival, Sean (Off) goes from suspecting “Black’s" sudden empathy and level-headedness to falling in love with this new version of him. With imprisonment and death a constant threat on their lives, White finds himself sparking a wide-spread uprising against capitalistic greed, corruption and civil rights infringements.

Cast and characters

Main 
Atthaphan Phunsawat (Gun) as Black / White
Jumpol Adulkittiporn (Off) as Sean

Supporting 
Tanutchai Wijitwongthong (Mond) as Gram
Kanaphan Puitrakul (First) as Yok
Harit Cheewagaroon (Sing) as Tod
Gawin Caskey (Fluke) as Dan
 Phromphiriya Thongputtaruk (Papang) as Kumpha
 Rachanun Mahawan (Film) as Eugene
 Bhasidi Petchsutee (Lookjun) as Namo

Reception

Thailand television ratings 
In the table below,  represents the lowest ratings and  represents the highest ratings.

 Based on the average audience share per episode.

Soundtracks

International broadcast 
 Philippines – The series is one of five GMMTV television series acquired by ABS-CBN Corporation after its successful acquisition of eight previous series under GMMTV. It was announced by Dreamscape Entertainment on 28 June 2021.

References

External links 
 Not Me on GMM 25 website 
 Not Me on AIS Play
 
 GMMTV

2020s LGBT-related drama television series
2021 Thai television series debuts
2021 Thai television series endings
Television series by GMMTV
Thai boys' love television series
Thai action television series